Body may refer to:

In science
 Physical body, an object in physics that represents a large amount, has mass or takes up space
 Body (biology), the physical material of an organism
 Body plan, the physical features shared by a group of animals
 Human body, the entire structure of a human organism
 Dead body, cadaver, or corpse, a dead human body
 (living) matter, see: Mind–body problem, the relationship between mind and matter in philosophy
 Aggregates within living matter, such as inclusion bodies

In arts and entertainment

In film and television
 Body (2015 Polish film), a 2015 Polish film
 Body (2015 American film), a 2015 American film
 "Body" (Wonder Showzen episode), a 2006 episode of American sketch comedy television series Wonder Showzen
 "Body", an episode of the Adult Swim television series, Off the Air

In literature and publishing
 body text, the text forming the main content of any printed matter
 body (typography), the size of a piece of metal type
 B.O.D.Y. (manga), by Ao Mimori
 B O D Y, an international online literary magazine

In music
 Electronic body music, a genre
 "Body" (Dreezy song), 2016
 "Body" (The Jacksons song), a song by The Jacksons from Victory, 1984
 "Body", a 2022 song by Ella Henderson from her second album Everything I Didn't Say
 "Body" (Ja Rule song), a 2007 hip-hop song
 "Body" (Loud Luxury song), a 2017 house song
 "Body" (Marques Houston song), a 2009 R&B song
 "Body" (Megan Thee Stallion song), a song by Megan Thee
Stallion from Good News, 2020
 Body song by (Julia Michaels ), from  Inner Monologue Part 2  2019 
 "Body" (Russ Millions and Tion Wayne song), a 2021 drill song
 "Body" (Sean Paul song), a 2017 dancehall song
 "Body", a 2010 song by Teairra Marí
 "Body", a song by Men Without Hats from No Hats Beyond This Point, 2003
 "Body", a song by Funky Green Dogs from Star, 1999
 Body (Aaamyyy album), Japanese musician Aaamyyy's 2019 debut album
 Body (The Necks album), 2018 album by The Necks
 B.O.D.Y. (album) (Band Of D Year), a 2006 album by Machel Montano
 Best Night of My Life, a 2010 Jamie Foxx album originally named Body

Other uses
Jesse Ventura (born 1951), nicknamed "The Body", American media personality, actor, author, former politician and retired professional wrestler
 Body (surname)
 Body (transistor), a terminal of a field-effect transistor
 Body (wine), a wine tasting descriptor of sense of alcohol and feeling in the mouth
 Automobile body, the outer body of a motor vehicle which is built around a chassis
 Body corporate, a corporation capable of having legal rights and duties within a certain legal system
 Body politic, metaphor in which a nation is considered to be a corporate entity, being likened to a human body
 An HTML element that contains the displayable content of a page

See also

 
 
 Bodi (disambiguation)
 Bodie (disambiguation)
 Bodies (disambiguation)
 Body of Evidence (disambiguation)
 Body part (disambiguation)
 Corporeal (disambiguation)
 Remains (disambiguation)
 The Body (disambiguation)